Littleham is an area of Exmouth in East Devon, England. It was historically a village and civil parish, much older than Exmouth itself.

The ecclesiastical parish is now known as Littleham-cum-Exmouth.  The original parish church dates back to the 13th century and is dedicated to St Margaret and St Andrew.  Frances Nelson, wife of Lord Nelson, is buried in the churchyard.  The newer parish church of the Holy Trinity was built in 1824.

Between 1903 and 1967 Littleham had its own railway station, on the Exmouth & Salterton Railway of the London and South Western Railway.

To the South of Littleham is Sandy Bay, with a large seaside caravan resort owned by Haven Holidays,  called Devon Cliffs.

References

External links 
Devon County Council: Littleham community page
GENUKI website

Littleham Leisure Centre

Villages in Devon
Former civil parishes in Devon
Exmouth